Cardinal Zen is a music producer based in France. He was part of the Café del Mar roster of artists and the founder of Transcode Recordings. He was born in San Fernando, Pampanga, Philippines.

Biography 
Cardinal Zen is one of the core members of the group of collective artists known as Electronica Manila. He is also one of the earlier pioneers of drum and bass in the Philippines under the names Makkina and Loop Theory. He cites Alias & Tarsier, DJ Krush, Aromabar, Mandalay, Mono, Massive Attack, Prefuse 73, and Enigma among his favorite artists.

Discography

Albums
Floppy Pillows EP (May 2005, QED Records)
 Deep Within
 I Dream of Hue
 Wishing Well
Summer Solstice (February 2013, Drizzly Music Gmbh)
 Summer Solstice
 Bent and Broken
 Far from Home (Cafe Del Mar Dreams Vol.4 Edit)
 Rain and Snow
 Spider Dance
 Warmth
 Winter Sonnet
 Midnite Sky
 Subway Graffiti 
 Summoning the Winds
 Wishing Well (Bonus Track)
 Up Above and Down Below
 Yukishiro (A Glimpse of Heaven)
 Fast Like Bullets
 Continuous Lounge Mix By Smooth Deluxe (feat. Smooth Deluxe) [60 Minutes Full of Pleasure]
Winter in Paris EP (December 2014, Transcode Recordings)[3]
 Winter in Paris (5:48)
Tangerine Sunset EP (June 2015, Transcode Recordings)[4]
 Tangerine Sunset (3:39)

Compilations 
Café Del Mar Dreams 4 (Various Artists) / (November 2006, Café Del Mar Music)[5]
LaBoracay 2015 (Various Artists) / (April 2015, ToneDef Beats)[6]

Remixes
Aromabar – Winter Pageant (Cardinal Zen Dreamy Remix)
Garbage – Milk (Cardinal Zen Smoothie Remix)
Sparkee – Inversion feat. Hazel Mae (Cardinal Zen Remix)

External links 
Official Website
Official Facebook Page
Cardinal Zen on Myspace
Café Del Mar Dreams 4 on Amazon.co.uk
Cardinal Zen Summer Solstice (Exquisite Lounge and Chillout Selection)

Living people
Filipino electronic musicians
Trip hop musicians
Musicians from Pampanga
20th-century Filipino musicians
21st-century Filipino musicians
Year of birth missing (living people)